Caroline Campbell (born Belfast) is an international art museum curator.  Since November 2022, she is director of the National Gallery of Ireland, being the first woman taking this position in the Gallery’s 158 year history.

Early life and education
Caroline Campbell was born and raised in Belfast, Northern Ireland.  She studied at the University of Oxford for her initial degree and the Courtauld Institute of Art for her Masters and PhD.

Career
Campbell has held positions in prominent institutions such as the Ashmolean Museum, the Courtauld Gallery and the National Gallery, London, where she was the director of collections and research.

Exhibitions
Among the exhibitions she curated and co-curated are Bellini and the East (2005–2006), Love and Marriage in Renaissance Florence (2009), Building the Picture: Architecture in Italian Renaissance Painting (2014) Duccio/Caro: In Dialogue (2015), and Mantegna and Bellini (2018). She was appointed director of the National Gallery of Ireland in 2022, succeeding Sean Rainbird, who had served as director since 2012.

References 

Museum people
People from Belfast
Alumni of the University of Oxford
Living people
Year of birth missing (living people)